A periscope is a device for viewing things past obstacles.

Periscope may also refer to:

 Periscope (album), 1999 stoner/psychedelic rock album by Colour Haze
 Periscope (app), a video streaming app
 Periscope  (arcade game), a 1960s coin-operated arcade game by Namco and Sega
 Le périscope, a 1916 film by Abel Gance
 Periscope Entertainment, a Los Angeles-based film company
 Periscope Pictures, a film production company based in Prince Edward Island, Canada
 Periscope Studio, a comics and illustration studio based in Portland, Oregon, USA
 Periscope (agency), an advertising agency in Minneapolis, Minnesota